The 1988 Dartmouth Big Green football team was an American football team that represented Dartmouth College during the 1988 NCAA Division I-AA football season. The Big Green tied for third in the Ivy League.

In its second under head coach Eugene "Buddy" Teevens, the team compiled a 5–5 record and outscored opponents 209 to 190. David Gazzaniga and Paul Michael were the team captains.

The Big Green's 4–3 conference tied for third in the Ivy League standings. Dartmouth outscored Ivy opponents 166 to 137. 

Dartmouth played its home games at Memorial Field on the college campus in Hanover, New Hampshire.

Schedule

References

Dartmouth
Dartmouth Big Green football seasons
Dartmouth Big Green football